Sarah Crowley (born 4 February 1983) is an Australian professional triathlete. She is the winner of the 2017 ITU Long Distance Triathlon World Championships and placed third at the 2017 Ironman World Championship.

Prior to her third place finish in 2017, Crowley had won two triathlons in 2017 at the Ironman distance and placed 15th at the 2016 Ironman World Championship.

References

Living people
1983 births
Australian female triathletes